Robert Rietti,  (born Lucio Rietti; 8 February 1923 – 3 April 2015), was an actor,  and Oscar-nominated director of Anglo-Italian descent. With over 200 credits to his name, he had a highly prolific career in the American, British and Italian entertainment industries. He was particularly prominent in post-production dubbing both foreign and domestic, often overseeing the English-language dubbing of foreign actors' dialogue. He is known for his dubbing work in the James Bond series, Lawrence of Arabia, Once Upon a Time in America, and The Guns of Navarone. He is often credited under the variant name spelling Robert Rietty.

Early life 
Born in 1923, Rietti was the younger of two sons of Italian-Jewish actor Victor Rietti and Rachel Rosenay. In 1932, at the age of nine, he joined his father's company Teatro Italiano, making his stage debut in Mysterious Currents. His father (under whom Ida Lupino and June Duprez had studied acting) developed his son's acting career under the name Bobby Rietti. He made his motion picture debut as Fattorino in Monty Banks' comedy Heads We Go  (1933). He soon caught the eye of David O. Selznick, who offered him an extended film contract.  Despite letting down Alfred Hitchcock, who handpicked him to play the lead in Sabotage (1936), he made 17 motion pictures during the 1930s, remaining a popular child actor throughout that decade. They would later work together in Hitchcock's film Frenzy.

Rietti was also active on the stage. At the age of twelve he played Jonathan across Elisabeth Bergner in James Barrie's last play, The Boy David (1936), which dramatised the Biblical story of King Saul and the young David. Altogether, in his boyhood years he acted in eighteen films and over one hundred and twenty plays.

Second World War
His successful career on the stage and in motion pictures was interrupted by the outbreak of the Second World War. Rietti and his brother, being Italian, were interned at Ascot internment camp. He later joined the Rifle Brigade, but accepted the army's request for him to head "Stars in Battledress", a group of young actors, which included the young Peter Ustinov and Terry-Thomas, who toured England, and were flown throughout liberated Europe, to entertain Allied troops. In 1945, he was invited by John Gielgud to join his production of Hamlet for troops in the Far East. After the war, he returned to work in the theatre, films, radio, and the latest medium, early television.

Career

Radio
In radio, he teamed up with Orson Welles in the radio series The Third Man (1951), and then again on the popular series The Black Museum (1952), which was broadcast to the US Armed Forces. This was to be the beginning of many collaborations between Rietti and Orson Welles, who remained close friends. He was also a regular on the radio series Horatio Hornblower (1952) with Michael Redgrave, The Scarlet Pimpernel (1952), Theatre Royal (1954) with Sir Laurence Olivier, and the classic Sherlock Holmes (1954) with John Gielgud and Ralph Richardson.

Television
His frequent work in television and many guest appearances made him a familiar face in the 1950s and 1960s. He is credited with 164 television appearances. He guest starred together with his father in The Jack Benny Program (1957) and in Harry's Girls (1960), which were both directed by his friend Ralph Levy, director of The Burns and Allen Show. They also performed together in three versions of his father's television success To Live in Peace and his father's television play Against the Stream (1959). In 1958, George Sanders presented Candle for the Madonna, an original television play Robert had written, in which Robert also played the lead.

Films
Among the earliest of his film appearances were with Leslie Howard in The Scarlet Pimpernel and with Douglas Fairbanks in The Private Life of Don Juan (both 1934). Of his 83 film appearances throughout his career, he is best remembered for contribution to the original James Bond pictures: besides Sean Connery, he was the only actor who appeared in both Thunderball (1965) and the re-make Never Say Never Again (1983). Other popular films he appeared in include The Italian Job (1969), Sunday Bloody Sunday (1971), The Omen (1976), as well as a cameo in Hannibal (2001). He played Robert Grant in Hell Is Empty (1967) for his brother, the producer Ronald Rietti.

Directing ADR 
With the growing popularity of epic international films in the 1950s, Rietti gained a reputation for directing the ADR in many international films like Lawrence of Arabia (1962) and the James Bond films. Rietti directed ADR in more than 700 Films and received international recognition as the foremost director in this field. He was nominated in Hollywood for the Golden Reel Award (a technical Oscar) for his ADR direction of the English version of Once Upon a Time in America (1984), in which he directed Robert De Niro's post syncing. He often cast a young Catherine Zeta Jones as a re-voicing artist. Impressed with her talent, he pushed Samuel Goldwyn Jr. to cast her at a time when the actress was unknown.

His own voice was used to re-voice Gregory Peck's German dialogue in Guns of Navarone (1961); and Orson Welles' in Treasure Island (1972). His voice was used in eight of the James Bond films, for which he directed the ADR; his best known work in the series was replacing the voice of Adolfo Celi in Thunderball (1965) and Tetsurō Tamba in You Only Live Twice (1967). In the last ten films of Jack Hawkins, who had lost his voice to throat cancer, Hawkins was dubbed by Rietti.

Playwright
Rietti was also a prolific playwright who translated and adapted many Italian plays (notably those of Luigi Pirandello), from his native Italian into English. He also wrote several original plays which were produced on the stage, for television, and for radio. He founded and served as executive editor for 18 years of Gambit, a theatre quarterly which published international plays, including many of his own. In recognition of their contribution to the arts, he was knighted together with his father, Victor Rietti, by the Italian government in 1959. Rietti's title Cavaliere was upgraded in 1988 to Cavaliere Ufficiale.

In 1957, Rietti played Satan in the York Mystery Plays; one of these performances was attended by the Queen.

Later life and death 
In 2012, he received an Honorary Doctorate from the  University of Florida for his lifetime achievements and contribution to the Arts. The year also marked an 80-year milestone for the then 89-year-old actor. Rietti remained active in his last years. He lectured to film students at film academies and universities, published an anthology of Italian Plays and was an active member of BAFTA.

Rietti died on 3 April 2015 in London, England, aged 92.

He is the father of Rabbi Jonathan Rietti, an educator and prominent speaker on Orthodox Judaism, most prominently for the international organisation Gateways.

Selected filmography

 Girls Will Be Boys (1934)
 The Scarlet Pimpernel (1934)
 The Private Life of Don Juan (1934)
 In Town Tonight (1935)
 Emil and the Detectives (1935)
 Call of the Blood (1949)
 Prelude to Fame (1950)
 The Black Rider (1954)
 They Who Dare (1954)
 Stock Car (1955)
 Mr. Arkadin (1955)
 Checkpoint (1956)
 The Truth About Women (1957)
 Tank Force (1958)
 Bluebeard's Ten Honeymoons (1960)
 Conspiracy of Hearts (1960)
 Sink the Bismarck  (1960)
 The Story of Joseph and His Brethren (1961)
 Middle Course (1961) 
 Time to Remember (1962)
 Dr. No (1962) as John Strangways and Superintendent Duff (voice)
 Lawrence of Arabia (1962) as Majid (voice)
 On the Beat (1962)
 The Scarlet Blade (1963)
 Thunderball (1965) as Emilio Largo (voice)
 The Bible: In the Beginning... (1966) as Abraham's Steward
 You Only Live Twice (1967) as Tiger Tanaka (voice)
 The Italian Job (1969) as Turin Police Chief
 On Her Majesty's Secret Service (1969) as Casino Baccarat Official
 Sunday Bloody Sunday (1971)
 Paper Tiger (1975) as Harok (voice)
 The Hiding Place (1975) as Willem ten Boom
 The Omen (1976) as Monk
 The Message (1976) (voice)
 The Devil's Men (1976) as Sgt. Vendris (voice)
 No Longer Alone (1976) as Joan's father
 Gulliver's Travels (1977) as Reldresal / King of Blefuscu (voice)
 Avalanche Express  (1979) as Gen. Marakov (voice), replacing the broken English used by Robert Shaw for the character in the original recording. 
 For Your Eyes Only (1981) as Ernst Stavro Blofeld (voice)
 Never Say Never Again (1983) as Italian Minister #1
 Madame Sousatzka (1988) as Leo Milev
 The March (1990) as Leo Borelli
 30 Door Key (1991)
 Sherlock Holmes and the Leading Lady (1991, TV Movie) as Franz Hoffman
 The Sea Change (1998) as Luigi
 Hilary and Jackie (1998) as Italian Flunky
 Hannibal (2001) as Sogliato

References

Bibliography

External links

1923 births
2015 deaths
English male child actors
English male film actors
English male television actors
English male stage actors
English male voice actors
Male actors from London
English Jews
Jewish English male actors
Film directors from London
People from Paddington
English people of Italian descent
English people of Italian-Jewish descent
British Army personnel of World War II
British expatriate male actors in the United States
Rifle Brigade soldiers